Barnes Switch (also known as Barnes) is an unincorporated community in Trinity County, Texas. The community is located at the junction of Texas State Highway 19 and Farm to Market Road 1893. Barnes Switch was formed around a railroad switch on the Waco, Beaumont, Trinity and Sabine Railway and was named for the physician S. E. Barnes. As of the early 1990s it had a population of 15.

Samuel E. Barnes attained a notable record as a merchant, cotton factor, banker, real estate broker, and churchman. Parents, Mississippi natives Jacob Pope Barnes and Elizabeth Ann Rankin moved to Texas in 1866 and came to Trinity in 1872.  Jacob opened a mercantile store in partnership with Frank Lister and was serving as county treasurer at the time of his death. Widowed at age 43, Elizabeth reared nine children and operated the mercantile store with the help of her eldest son, Samuel Edward (1861-1914).

References

See also
 Texas
  Trinity County, Texas
 Trinity County California

Unincorporated communities in Trinity County, Texas
Unincorporated communities in Texas